Bernard Depierre (born 6 June 1945 in Bourbon-Lancy) is a member of the National Assembly of France.  He represents the Côte-d'Or department,  and is a member of the Union for a Popular Movement.

References

1945 births
Living people
People from Saône-et-Loire
Rally for the Republic politicians
Union for a Popular Movement politicians
Deputies of the 12th National Assembly of the French Fifth Republic
Deputies of the 13th National Assembly of the French Fifth Republic